Sir Hamilton William Kerr, 1st Baronet (1 August 1903 – 26 December 1974) was a British Conservative Party politician and journalist.

Early life
Kerr was born on 1 August 1903.  He was second son born to Americans Olive (née Grace) Kerr and banker Henry Scanlan Kerr of Long Island. After his father's death, his mother remarried to Charles Greville, shortly thereafter the 3rd Baron Greville. His older brother was Henry Grace Kerr, who was killed in France during World War I. His paternal grandparents were William Henry Kerr and Harriet Ellen (née Scanlan) Kerr.  His mother was a niece of Michael P. Grace and Mayor William Russell Grace, founder of W. R. Grace and Company.

He was educated at Eton and Balliol College, Oxford.

Career
After his graduation from Oxford, he then took up a career in journalism and worked on the Daily Mail and the Daily Telegraph.

At the 1931 general election, he was elected as the Member of Parliament for the Oldham constituency in Lancashire. He held the seat until losing it to Labour at the 1945 general election. In the 1930s, Kerr served as Parliamentary Private Secretary to Alfred Duff Cooper, starting in 1933 when Cooper was Financial Secretary to the War Office. During the Second World War, he served in a balloon squadron in the Royal Air Force and briefly held office as Parliamentary Secretary to the Ministry of Health in the 1945 caretaker government.

At the 1950 general election, he was returned to the House of Commons as the MP for Cambridge, holding that seat until his retirement at the 1966 general election. In 1954, Kerr was appointed Parliamentary Private Secretary to the future Prime Minister Harold Macmillan.

Kerr was made a Baronet, of Cambridge in the County of Cambridge, in 1957. The title became extinct upon his death in 1974.

Legacy
The Hamilton Kerr Institute was established in 1976 in the riverside property given to Cambridge University for the Fitzwilliam Museum and endowed by Sir Hamilton Kerr. The HKI provides art conservation services and training.

References

External links 
 

1903 births
1974 deaths
Alumni of Balliol College, Oxford
Baronets in the Baronetage of the United Kingdom
Conservative Party (UK) MPs for English constituencies
Ministers in the Churchill caretaker government, 1945
People educated at Eton College
Politics of the Metropolitan Borough of Oldham
UK MPs 1931–1935
UK MPs 1935–1945
UK MPs 1950–1951
UK MPs 1951–1955
UK MPs 1955–1959
UK MPs 1959–1964
UK MPs 1964–1966